Márk Kleisz (born 2 July 1998) is a Hungarian footballer who plays as a midfielder for III. Kerületi TVE on loan from Vasas SC.

Club career

Vasas
In 2016, Kleisz was called up for Vasas SC's first team. On 17 July 2016, Kleisz made his senior team debut in the Nemzeti Bajnokság I against MTK Budapest, replacing Martin Ádám at the 86th minute.

Club career statistics

References

External links

Living people
1998 births
Hungarian footballers
Hungary international footballers
Association football midfielders
Vasas SC players
III. Kerületi TUE footballers
Nemzeti Bajnokság I players
Nemzeti Bajnokság II players
Footballers from Budapest